Wen Zengxian (June 1952 – 31 January 2020) was a Chinese politician who served as Deputy director-general of the Civil Affairs Department of Hubei Province from 1997 to 2010.

Biography 
Wen was born in Xinye County, Henan. In April 1972, he started to work at Xiangfan Municipal Propaganda Team. In January 1975, he worked as a clerk at Xiangfan Municipal Bureau of Culture. He joined the Communist Party of China in September 1976.

Wen entered Wuhan University in February 1977, majoring in Chinese Language and Literature. After earning his bachelor's degree in January 1980, he started to work at Politics Division of the Civil Affairs Department of Hubei Province. Later, he served as the President of Hubei Civil Administration School (December 1988 – January 1993), Director of the General Office of Hubei Provincial Commerce Department (January 1993 – June 1997), then the Deputy director-general of the Civil Affairs Department of Hubei Province (June 1997 – February 2010). He was appointed inspector of Civil Affairs Department since February 2010. He was also the President of Hubei Social Organization General Chamber of Commerce.

Wen died on 31 January 2020. His death was suspected of being caused by the COVID-19 infection. Many Chinese media (including Sina, Sohu, NetEase and Phoenix Television) had reported his death, however, the news was soon deleted due to censorship.

References

1952 births
2020 deaths
20th-century Chinese politicians
21st-century Chinese politicians
Wuhan University alumni
Chinese Communist Party politicians from Henan
People's Republic of China politicians from Henan
Political office-holders in Hubei
People from Nanyang, Henan
Deaths from the COVID-19 pandemic in China